Cassh Maluia (born October 3, 1998) is an American football linebacker who is a free agent. He played college football at Wyoming, and was drafted by the New England Patriots in the sixth round of the 2020 NFL Draft.

College career
Maluia grew up in Compton, California and signed with Wyoming, the first school to offer him a football scholarship, out of high school. As a sophomore, Maluia recorded 74 tackles. In his senior season in 2019, he had 61 tackles (including seven for a loss), half a sack, and two interceptions while starting at weak-side linebacker. He earned honorable mention all-Mountain West Conference honors. In his career at Wyoming Maluia had 197 tackles and 16.5 tackles for loss.

Professional career

New England Patriots
Maluia was selected by the New England Patriots in the sixth round of the 2020 NFL Draft with the 204th overall pick. He was waived on September 5, 2020, and signed to the practice squad the next day. He was promoted to the active roster the following day. He was waived on November 10, 2020, and re-signed to the practice squad two days later. He was elevated to the active roster on November 14 and December 28 for the team's weeks 10 and 16 games against the Baltimore Ravens and Buffalo Bills, and reverted to the practice squad after each game. On January 2, 2021, Maluia was promoted to the active roster. He was waived after the season on March 23, 2021.

On August 7, 2021, Maluia re-signed with the Patriots. He was waived on August 24, 2021.

Tennessee Titans
On August 26, 2021, Maluia signed with the Tennessee Titans. He was waived on August 29, 2021.

References

External links
 Wyoming Cowboys bio

1998 births
Living people
Players of American football from Compton, California
American football linebackers
Wyoming Cowboys football players
New England Patriots players
Tennessee Titans players